The 147th Regiment Illinois Volunteer Infantry was an infantry regiment that served in the Union Army during the American Civil War.

Service
The 147th Illinois Infantry was organized at Chicago, Illinois, and mustered into Federal service on February 18, 1865, for a one-year enlistment.  The 147th served in garrisons and operated against guerillas in Georgia.

The regiment was mustered out of service on January 20, 1866.

Total strength and casualties
The regiment suffered 3 enlisted men killed in action or mortally wounded, and 31 enlisted men who died of disease for a total of 34 fatalities.

Commanders
 Colonel Hiram Franklin Sickles - mustered out with the regiment.

See also
List of Illinois Civil War Units
Illinois in the American Civil War

Notes

References
The Civil War Archive

Units and formations of the Union Army from Illinois
Military units and formations established in 1865
1865 establishments in Illinois
Military units and formations disestablished in 1866
1866 disestablishments in Illinois